Opelika City Schools (OCS) is a school district headquartered in Opelika, Alabama. The district is accredited by the Alabama State Department of Education and the Southern Association of Colleges and Schools. The school system enrolls approximately 4,300 students on nine campuses. Opelika has three primary schools with grades K–2, Southview, Jeter, and Carver, three intermediate schools with grades 3–5, West Forest, Northside, and Morris Avenue, Opelika Middle School with grades 6–8, Opelika High School with grades 9–12, and one at-risk school, Opelika Learning Center. Opelika's schools have traditionally had strong programs in technology and the arts.

Beginning with Pre-K, students in the Opelika City Schools are offered a challenging and diverse curriculum.  Individual student needs are met through grade level curriculum, intervention and remediation classes, as well as enrichment and accelerated courses.  All students have ample opportunities for fine arts instruction as well as many extracurricular choices.  Classrooms have fully integrated technology systems that include laptops, tablets, mounted projectors, Promethean™ boards, ActivSlates and Elmo™ document cameras.  There are also several sets of ActivVotes and ActivExpressions available for teacher/student use.  Opelika City Schools employ highly qualified teachers trained in the latest instructional techniques including the Alabama Reading Initiative (ARI), Transforming East Alabama Mathematics (TEAM-Math), Alabama Math, Science and Technology Initiative (AMSTI), and Science in Motion.

Elementary schools
All elementary schools have school-wide Title I programs.  They provide a warm learning environment to meet the needs of all students.  The rigorous curriculum is aligned with the Alabama Courses of Study and is directed by system-wide pacing guides developed by teachers.  This consistency allows transient students a greater opportunity for success.  The Harcourt program and the Scott Foresman Investigations program provide the basic framework for the reading and math curricula.  In addition, teachers use system-wide writing rubrics and administer common assessments throughout the year.

All students in grades PreK-5 receive music and art instruction by teachers in these special areas.  The music program also provides all third grade students with nine weeks of violin lessons and encourages selected students to continue these lessons in fourth and fifth grades.  An Enrichment Program is provided for students in grades 3-5 through whole group and small group classes.  The Enrichment teachers design programs that extend student thinking and allow students to develop higher order skills through their own learning styles.  Technology labs and multiple classroom computers allow development of technology skills embedded in all content areas.

Middle school
Opelika Middle School (OMS) was selected as a 2010 Alabama CLAS Banner School in recognition of its outstanding programs and services to students.  In addition, OMS was one of only 11 schools in Alabama presented with the Alabama Safe Schools Award of Excellence in 2008.

Opelika Middle School operates as a true middle school model.  Students are taught in teams for stronger support and enhanced relationships with teachers.  Teams afford interdisciplinary learning and allow students to transition from elementary classrooms to a six period day.  Advanced classes are offered on every team in every core subject with inclusion classes also accommodating students with special needs.  Utilizing common planning time, teachers work in a collaborative environment with both their grades and departments.  Teacher-designed curriculum maps, common assessments, and regular discussion of teaching practices and learning outcomes ensure that all students are provided a challenging curriculum.

The OMS Gateway to Technology program focuses on the STEM Curriculum (Science, Technology, Engineering and Math).  As part of PLTW (Project Lead the Way ) students begin to understand how their education is relevant to their lives and future careers through hands-on learning and real-world problem solving.

Students at the middle school level have the opportunity to be involved in Band, Chorus, Show choir, Art, a variety of technology based classes and school sports teams.  In addition, each day begins with enrichment classes that allow students to participate in targeted math, reading, or project based learning activities.  The project based learning activities include financial literacy, structural engineering, cultural investigations, current events, and strategic games where students work collaboratively in problem solving.

With the arts being an integral part of this community, OMS offers an array of fine arts courses.  Sixth grade students rotate through introductory fine arts classes of band, chorus and art.  Seventh and eighth grade students may choose to participate in the fine arts electives of band and chorus.  Physical education classes focus on fitness, health, and basic rules of sports in alignment with the Alabama Course of Study.  Sports offered include football, softball, baseball, soccer, wrestling, basketball, volleyball, tennis, golf, track and cross country.  Clubs range from 4H to National Junior Honor Society.

High school
Opelika High School was originally built in 1972.  In August 2014, a $46 million renovation and construction project was completed.  The new building contains 87 new classrooms on two floors including seven computer labs.  Each classroom is outfitted with a Promethean interactive whiteboard, projector and ELMO document camera.  The business technology labs are outfitted with ClearTouch 70" interactive displays that are fully integrated with new educational software.  New classrooms include general classrooms for core classes, science labs, an ACCESS computer lab for distance learning and specialty classrooms for Consumer Science, Health Science, Driver's Education, Art, Special Education, Business Tech, Engineering, Publishing and Horticulture.  OHS also features a new cafeteria, kitchen and serving area.  Bulldog Stadium now has a turf field, new concession areas, new restrooms and ticket booths.  A 22,000 square foot indoor athletic facility including a turf practice field, Varsity locker room, offices and meeting rooms was also built.  Renovations were also completed for the OHS baseball field, the Women's athletic facility, and the girls and boys PE areas.

OHS offers classes designed for each student's learning level, from individual assistance to Advanced Placement.  Advanced Placement classes are offered in History, Biology, Chemistry, Government & Economics, English Composition, English Literature, Art, Statistics, Physics and Calculus.  Dual enrollment is an option for students to earn both high school and college credits at Southern Union State Community College whose Opelika campus is located directly across the street from the high school.  Courses available for dual enrollment include Pre-Calculus, Calculus and US History 1.

Career Technical classes prepare students for immediate transition following graduation into the workplace or articulated courses offered at Southern Union and other community colleges.  Programs include horticulture, business information technology, family and consumer science, engineering, and health science.  The annual horticulture department plant sale raises thousands of dollars for scholarships and program expenses.

Continuing the strong arts program of the school system, OHS offers band, chorus, showchoir, visual arts, theater, and video production.  The band department includes concert, symphonic and jazz bands in addition to the award-winning "Spirit of the South" marching band.  Four different choirs are offered by the choral department: the Ovations coed show choir, the Impressions girls' show choir, Women's Chamber Choir and Chamber Choir.  The show choir groups perform and compete all over the country and have received countless accolades including Grand Champion in the Fame Showchoir America Competition in Washington, D.C., Best Show Design, Best Choreography and Best Vocals awards in numerous competitions, and was the highest ranked Alabama school in the 2009 National Showchoir Ranking System.

The award-winning Opelika High Theatre Society is known around the region and state for its quality performances.  A play in the fall, an advanced theatre competition at mid-year and a spring musical all attract hundreds from surrounding communities.  In addition to performances, theatre department courses include set design, set-up and light/sound production.

OHS also provides unique opportunities for students in courses such as desktop publishing, guitar, and foreign languages including Latin, Spanish and French.  Students enrolled in desktop publishing produce Perspectives, an award-winning literary magazine for which the art and graphics are provided by students enrolled in an advanced art class.  Other publications include The Mainstreet Gazette, a student newspaper, and ZigZag, the student yearbook.

Athletics is another important component of the high school experience.  The athletics program is a competitive 6A program that offers many different opportunities.  Sports include football, baseball, track, cross country, soccer, wrestling, volleyball, golf, basketball, swimming, softball and tennis.  A newly formed cheerleader competition squad recently placed second in the state competition.   Students may also choose to participate in any of approximately 30 clubs ranging from Future Farmers of America to the National Honor Society.

Schools

Secondary schools
 Opelika High School
 Opelika Middle School
Primary schools
 Morris Avenue Intermediate School
 Northside Intermediate School
 West Forest Intermediate School
 Carver Primary School
 Jeter Primary School
 Southview Primary School

Gallery

References

External links

 Opelika City Schools

School districts in Alabama
Education in Lee County, Alabama